Hermann Albrecht (born 1 September 1961) is a former German football referee.

Sporting career
Albrecht became an international referee in 1993. During his career he has arbitrated in the Bundesliga, 2. Bundesliga, DFB-Pokal, UEFA Europa League, UEFA Cup Winners' Cup, and qualifications of the UEFA Champions League and the UEFA European Championship.

He done a total of 192 Bundesliga games and 88 games in the 2nd Bundesliga.

He has arbitrated 7 UEFA Cup matches, the first in 1995-1996 between AC Omonia and S.S. Lazio on September 26, 1995.

He also has arbitrated 5 UEFA Cup Winners' Cup Games, the first in 1994-1995 between FC Chornomorets Odesa and Grasshopper Club Zürich on September 29, 1994.

He debuted in the Bundesliga on August 16, 1989 in the 1. FC Köln - 1. FC Kaiserslautern match.

He concluded his career in 2005. He currently works in Kaufbeuren.

References

External links
 Profile at worldfootball.net

1961 births
Living people
German football referees
20th-century German people